Football Club Sumy is an association football club based in Sumy, Ukraine. It was formed when LSG Syrovatka adopted the new name FC Sumy and a variation of the city's coat of arms for its logo.

History 
The football club was established in January of 2016 in the village Verkhnya Syrovatka, Sumy as LSG Syrovatka. The club was named after a law firm LS Group which is headed by its president Hennadiy Demyanenko. Since 2019–20 season the main team began to play its home games in Sumy. On 3 March 2020 the football club was renamed to FC Sumy. The club's leadership emphasizes that it has no relation to the original PFC Sumy that was liquidated in 2019.

Honours 
 Sumy Oblast Championship
 Winner (1): 2019
 Sumy Oblast Cup
 Winner (1): 2018
 Runners-up (1): 2019
 Sumy Oblast Super Cup
 Winner (1): 2020

Current squad

League and cup history

Coaches

 Serhiy Strashnenko (2020 – 2021)
 Valeriy Kutsenko  (30 March 2021 – 14 October 2021) 
 Evgeny Yarovenko  (19 January 2022 – present)

See also
PFC Sumy
Spartak Sumy

References

External links
Official website

Football clubs in Sumy
Association football clubs established in 2016
2016 establishments in Ukraine
Ukrainian Second League clubs